Banten is a province of Indonesia.

Banten may also refer to:
 Banten Sultanate, a historical Islamic monarchy in Banten, Indonesia
 Banten (town), a historical port town in Banten, Indonesia
 Old Banten, an archaeological site in Banten, Indonesia
 Banten Bay, a bay in Banten, Indonesia

See also
Bantam (disambiguation)